Andor Fejér (born January 25, 1960) is a Hungarian electrical engineer and politician, member of the National Assembly (MP) for Kunhegyes (Jász-Nagykun-Szolnok County Constituency VII) from 2010 to 2014.

Fejér served as President of the General Assembly of Jász-Nagykun-Szolnok County between 2006 and 2010. He was a member of the Parliamentary Committee on Sustainable Development since May 14, 2010 and the Committee on Consumer Protection since March 7, 2011 until both December 31, 2012.

References

1960 births
Living people
Romanian people of Hungarian descent
Fidesz politicians
Members of the National Assembly of Hungary (2010–2014)
People from Cluj County